Arsinoe was a city in southwestern ancient Cyprus, lying between Old and New Paphos, with a harbour, temple, and sacred grove described by Strabo. The city was founded by Ptolemy Philadelphus and named for Arsinoe II of Egypt, his wife and sister. Cyprus, from its subjection to the kings of the Lagid family, had more than one city of this name, which was common to several princesses of that house; see Arsinoe.

The site of Arsinoe is tentatively located near modern Geroskipou-Litharka/Vounimenos.

References

Populated places in ancient Cyprus
Cities in ancient Cyprus
Former populated places in Cyprus
Ptolemaic colonies